The Queen's Book of the Red Cross was published in November 1939 in a fundraising effort to aid the Red Cross during World War II. The book was sponsored by Queen Elizabeth, and its contents were contributed by fifty British authors and artists.

List of authors and artists

Authors
A. E. W. Mason, "The Conjurer", a story
Hugh Walpole, "The Church in the Snow", a story
John Masefield, "Red Cross", a poem
Ian Hay, "The Man who had Something Against Him"
Charles Morgan, "Creative Imagination", an essay
D. L. Murray, "Only a Sojer!", a story
T. S. Eliot, "The Marching Song of the Pollicle Dogs", a poem
T. S. Eliot, "Billy M'Caw: The Remarkable Parrot", a poem
H. M. Tomlinson, "Ports of Call", a story
A. A. Milne, "The General Takes Off His Helmet", a play
Cecil Roberts, "Down Ferry Lane"
E. M. Delafield, "The Provincial Lady in War-time", a story
Cedric Hardwicke, "One Man in His Time Plays Many Parts"
Daphne du Maurier, "The Escort", a story
Ann Bridge, "Looking Back on May the Sixth, 1935"
Jan Struther, "Mrs. Miniver makes a List", a story
Eric Ambler, "The Army of Shadows", a story
Howard Marshall, "The Fisherman's England"
Humfrey Jordan, "The Boatswain Yawned", a story
Alfred Noyes, "A Child's Gallop", a poem
Alfred Noyes, "The Stranger", a poem
O. Douglas, "Such an Odd War!", a story
Howard Spring, "Christmas Honeymoon", a story
Dorothy Whipple, "No Robbery", a story
Lord Mottistone, "Tell Them, Warrior"
L. A. G. Strong, "A Gift from Christy Keogh", a story
Walter de la Mare, "And So To Bed", a poem
Walter de la Mare, "Joy", a poem
Denis Mackail, "It's the Thought that Counts", a story
Gracie Fields, "On Getting Better"
C. H. Middleton, "Keep That Garden Going"
Georgette Heyer, "Pursuit", a story
Edith Evans, "The Patriotism of Shakespeare", an essay
H. C. Bailey, "The Thistle Down", a story
C. Day-Lewis, "Orpheus and Eurydice", a translation from Virgil's "Georgics"
Ruby Ferguson, "Mrs. Memmary's Visitors", a story
J. B. Morton, "A Love Song"
Frank Smythe, "The Crag"
Mary Thomas, "Our Knitting Forces"
Collie Knox, "This Flag Still Flies Over All Mankind", homage to the Red Cross

Artists 
Cecil Beaton, a photograph of the Queen
William Russell Flint, The Words of His Majesty the King, a picture
Edmund Dulac, a picture
Frank Brangwyn, a picture
J. Morton Sale, The Red Cross of Comfort, a picture
Edmund Blampied, The Symbol, a picture
Dame Laura Knight, Hop Pickers, a picture
Bip Pares, a picture
Arthur Wragg, a picture
Norman Wilkinson, a picture
Rex Whistler, In the Wilderness, a picture
Mabel Lucie Attwell, a picture
Ivor Novello, We'll Remember, a manuscript of a war song

Bibliographic information 
Title: The Queen's book of the Red Cross : with a message from Her Majesty the Queen and contributions by fifty British authors and artists : in aid of the Lord Mayor of London's fund for the Red Cross and the Order of St. John of Jerusalem.

Author: Elizabeth, Queen consort of George VI, King of Great Britain; T S Eliot; John Masefield; British Red Cross Society.; Knights of Malta.

Publisher: [London] : Hodder and Stoughton, 1939.

Description: 255 p., [13] leaves of plates : ill. (some col.), facsims., music ; 26 cm.

Reference: 

1939 books
British books
Queen Elizabeth The Queen Mother
1939 in the United Kingdom
International Red Cross and Red Crescent Movement